This is a list of lighthouses in Tonga.

Lighthouses

See also
 Lists of lighthouses and lightvessels

References

External links
 

Tonga
Lighthouses

Lighthouses